Alexander Vasilyevich Prokopchuk (18 November 1961) is a  Russian employee of the internal affairs agencies, head of the Ministry of Internal Affairs of the Russian Federation National Central Bureau of Interpol from 14 June 2011, and vice-president of Interpol from 10 November 2016.

Early life and education
Prokopchuk was born in the Ukrainian Soviet Socialist Republic, USSR. He graduated from Kyiv State University with a degree in Romano-Germanic Languages and Literature in 1983, and the Financial University with a degree in law in 2000. Candidate of Economic Sciences.

Controversy and career
Following the unexpected disappearance of Meng Hongwei by Chinese authorities in 2018, Prokopchuk became the likely successor to Hongwei as President of Interpol. However, both Bill Browder of Hermitage Capital Management and Mikhail Khodorkovsky lobbied against Prokopchuk stating that his presidency would be like the mafia running a police organization. Bill Browder asserted that Prokopchuk is one of Vladimir Putin's puppets and urged Canada to help expel Russia from Interpol. On 21 November 2018, Interpol elected Kim Jong-yang from South Korea as its president.

Personal life
His younger brother, Ihor Prokopchuk, is a Ukrainian diplomat who serves as the country's permanent representative to the OSCE.

References

External links
 Alexander Prokopchuk  at the MIA
 Александр Прокопчук. Досье // Argumenty i fakty

1961 births
Living people
Russian major generals
International law scholars
Interpol officials
Russian police officers
Taras Shevchenko National University of Kyiv alumni
Russian people of Ukrainian descent
People from Korosten
Financial University under the Government of the Russian Federation alumni